Domingo Pilarte may refer to:
 Domingo Pilarte (evangelist)
 Domingo Pilarte (fighter)